is a Japanese animation studio based in Tokyo founded on December 1, 2017.

Works

Television series

Original video animation

References

External links

  
 

Animation studios in Tokyo
 
Japanese animation studios
Mass media companies established in 2017
Japanese companies established in 2017